South Union may refer to a location in the United States:

 South Union, Kentucky, an unincorporated community
 South Union Shaker Center House and Preservatory
 South Union, South Carolina, a census-designated place
 South Union Missionary Baptist Church, Palestine, Texas
 South Union School, Southborough, Massachusetts
 South Union Street Historic District (disambiguation), locations in North Carolina
 South Union Street Historic District (Concord, North Carolina)
 South Union Street–Boardman River Bridge, Michigan
 South Union Township, Fayette County, Pennsylvania

See also
 Old South Union Church, Weymouth, Massachusetts
 Shaker Museum at South Union, Kentucky